The following is a list of chief ministers of KwaZulu, since its establishment in 1970.

List

(Dates in italics indicate de facto continuation of office)

Political affiliation
IFP – Inkatha Freedom Party

See also
Bantustan
Governor-General of South Africa
State President of South Africa
President of South Africa
Prime Minister of South Africa
Apartheid
List of historical unrecognized states and dependencies

External links
World Statesmen – South Africa (South African Homelands/KwaZulu)

KwaZulu Chief Ministers
KwaZulu
KwaZulu Chief Ministers